Stefanos Iliadis (born September 17, 1994) is a Cypriot professional basketball player for Apollon Limassol of the Cypriot League. He studied for the University of South Florida, but he didn't manage to make it to the team's roster. Iliadis entered the 2016 NBA draft but was not selected in the draft's two rounds.

College career
Iliadis studied for the University of South Florida, but he didn't manage to make it to the team's roster. During his studies, he was also playing for some games with Apollon Limassol in both the Cypriot League and to the FIBA EuroChallenge.

Professional career
Iliadis made his professional debut with Apollon Limassol in 2011 against ENAD Ayiou Dometiou. Until 2017, he didn't manage to get a lot of games with the club, but during that period, he won the Cypriot Cup with the club in 2014. After 2017, he gained a bigger role in the team's squad, and from the 2018–19 season, he became the starting point guard of the club.

On May 27, 2020, Iliadis joined APOEL.

Cyprus national team
Iliadis has been a member of the junior national teams of Cyprus for some years. Now, he is also a member of the Cyprus national team.

References

External links
RealGM.com Profile
Eurobasket.com Profile
Fiba.basketball Profile

1994 births
Living people
Cypriot men's basketball players
Apollon Limassol BC players
South Florida Bulls men's basketball players
Point guards